Incineration is a waste treatment process.

Incinerate may also refer to:
 Incinerate (Sphere Lazza album), 1995
 +incinerate, a 1994 EP by Sphere Lazza
 Incinerate, a 2007 album by Dew-Scented
 "Incinerate", a 2006 song by Sonic Youth from Rather Ripped

See also
 Combustion
 Cremation